Rawail is a given name and surname. Notable people with the given name and surname include:

Surname 
Harnam Singh Rawail  (1921–2004), Indian filmmaker
Rahul Rawail (born 1951), Indian film director
Rajat Rawail, Indian film producer, director and actor

Given name 
Rawail Singh (born 1956), Indian academic and Professor of Punjabi at Delhi University